Lakulish Yoga University is a private university located in Chharodi, near Ahmedabad, Gujarat, India, opposite Nirma University. The university was established in 2013 by the  Lakulish International Fellowship's Enlightenment Mission (LIFE Mission) through The Gujarat Private Universities (Amendment) Act, 2013. It provides higher education courses in Yoga.

References

External links

Universities in Ahmedabad
Educational institutions established in 2013
2013 establishments in Gujarat
Private universities in India
Yoga schools